Ochrosia elliptica, known as elliptic yellowwood, bloodhorn or kopsia is a flowering tree native to north-eastern Australia, Lord Howe Island and New Caledonia.

The tree bears an inedible red colored fruit with a white sticky flesh. It has been introduced to Florida where it is considered invasive  and also to the Bahamas.

Ochrosia elliptica is an evergreen shrub or small tree usually growing 4–6 metres tall but sometimes reaching 12 metres. It has leathery dark green elliptic to obovate leaves up to 8–20cm long and 4–8cm wide.

The leaves occur in whorls of 3 or 4. The flowers occur in axilliary clusters and are small, yellow/white and fragrant. They are followed by pairs of striking red fruit 5–6 cm long by 2–3 cm in diameter, which resemble elongated tomatoes or a pair of red horns. The fruits are poisonous, and plants bleed white sap copiously when wounded.

Uses

The plant is harvested from the wild for local use as a medicine and source of beads. It is cultivated for its medicinal use in China. It is widely distributed as an ornamental, being valued for its startling bright red fruits and dense clusters of cream flowers that are produced throughout the year on an open spreading leafy canopy.

Fruit and sap are highly poisonous.

Other names

Local names

China: Gu cheng mei gui shu.

English: Berrywood tree, Bloodhorn, Elliptic yellowwood, Mangrove ochrosia, Wedge apple.

References

elliptica
Flora of Lord Howe Island
Trees of New Caledonia
Flora of Queensland